Samsaram Sagaram is a 1973 Indian Telugu-language drama film written and directed by Dasari Narayana Rao.The film won two Nandi Awards.

Cast
 Satyanarayana
 Jayanthi
 Rama Prabha
 M. Prabhakar Reddy		
 G. Varalakshmi		
 Kaikala Satyanarayana		
 Gummadi
 S. V. Ranga Rao

Soundtrack
 "Aaja Beta Oh Mere Raja Beta" (Singer: S. P. Balasubrahmanyam)
 "Divvi Divvi Divvitlu Deepavali Divvitlu"
 "Intiki Deepam Illalu Aa Deepakantula Kiranale Pillalu" (Singer: S. P. Balasubrahmanyam)
 "Narayano Narayana Nee Peru Naa Peru Narayana"
 "Samsaram Sagaram Bratuke Oka Navaga Aashe Chukkaniga Payaninche O Navika" (Singer: S. P. Balasubrahmanyam)

Awards
Nandi Awards - 1973
Third Best Feature Film - Bronze - K. Raghava
Best Story Writer - Dasari Narayana Rao

References

External links
 

1973 films
Films directed by Dasari Narayana Rao
1970s Telugu-language films